Tuberculous lymphadenitis (or tuberculous adenitis) is the most common form of tuberculosis infections that appears outside the lungs.  Tuberculous lymphadenitis is a chronic, specific granulomatous inflammation of the lymph node with caseation necrosis, caused by infection with Mycobacterium tuberculosis or related bacteria.

The characteristic morphological element is the tuberculous granuloma (caseating tubercule). This consists of giant multinucleated cells and (Langhans cells), surrounded by epithelioid cells aggregates, T cell lymphocytes and fibroblasts. Granulomatous tubercules eventually develop central caseous necrosis and tend to become confluent, replacing the lymphoid tissue.

Symptoms and signs
In addition to swollen lymph nodes, called lymphadenitis, the person may experience mild fevers, not feel like eating, or lose weight.

Cause
It is usually caused by the most common cause of tuberculosis in the lungs, namely Mycobacterium tuberculosis.  It has sometimes also been caused by related bacteria, including M. bovis, M. kansasii, M. fortuitum, M. marinum, and Mycobacterium ulcerans.

Stages
Stages of tubercular lymphadenitis:
 Lymphadenitis
 Periadenitis
 Cold abscess
 'Collar stud' abscess
 Sinus

Tuberculous lymphadenitis is popularly known as collar stud abscess, due to its proximity to the collar bone and its superficial resemblance to a collar stud, although this is just one of the five stages of the disease.  One or more affected lymph nodes can also be in a different body part, although it is most typical to have at least one near the collar bone.The characteristic morphological element is the tuberculous granuloma (caseating tubercule): giant multinucleated cells (Langhans cells), surrounded by epithelioid cells aggregates, T cell lymphocytes and few fibroblasts. Granulomatous tubercules evolve to central caseous necrosis and tend to become confluent, replacing the lymphoid tissue.

Diagnosis
The diagnosis of tuberculous lymphadenitis may require a biopsy. Other possible diagnostic steps include: positive tuberculin test, chest radiograph, CT scan, cytology/biopsy (FNAC), AFB staining, and mycobacterial culture.

Treatment

Drainage is not necessary if followed by anti-tubercular medication.

Treatment with anti-tubercular medications normally lasts up to one year.  Symptoms may temporarily get worse during treatment.

Epidemiology
Tuberculous lymphadenitis is seen in most developing countries, especially in the context of HIV/AIDS.

References

External links 

Anatomical pathology
Tuberculosis